The 2008 North Texas Mean Green football team represented the University of North Texas in the 2008 NCAA Division I FBS football season. The season was the team's second under head coach Todd Dodge.  Gary DeLoach was hired in the off-season as the new defensive coordinator replacing Ron Mendoza. The Mean Green played their home games on campus at Fouts Field in Denton, Texas.

Schedule

Schedule from MeanGreenSports.com

Game summaries

Kansas State

Kansas State overpowered North Texas on both sides of the ball, scoring on six of its first seven possessions to take a 42–0 lead, holding the Mean Green to 205 total yards—81 in the first half. Kansas State quarterback Josh Freeman threw for three touchdowns and rushed for another two. Quarterback Giovanni Vizza completed 16 of 29 passes for 100 yards, including the Mean Green's only touchdown of the game, a 9-yard pass to Alex Lott late in the third quarter.

Tulsa

LSU

Rice

This game will be just the second meeting between both teams with the first meeting happening in 1988 when North Texas defeated Rice 33–17 in Houston.

Florida International

Louisiana-Lafayette

Louisiana-Monroe

Troy

Western Kentucky

Florida Atlantic

Middle Tennessee

Arkansas State

References

North Texas
North Texas Mean Green football seasons
North Texas Mean Green football